

Æthelstan (or Athelstan; died 1056) was a medieval Bishop of Hereford.

Æthelstan was consecrated between 1013 and 1016. Before his death, he had been blind for 13 years, and Tremerig was appointed as a suffragan bishop to assist Æthelstan. Tremerig died shortly before Æthelstan did. Because of his blindness, the task of helping defend the border against the Welsh fell to the bishops of Worcester.

Æthelstan died on 10 February 1056. His death may have been from old age, or it may have been as a consequence of the burning of his cathedral by the Welsh shortly before. After his death, he was considered for sainthood.

Citations

References

External links
 

Bishops of Hereford
11th-century English Roman Catholic bishops
1056 deaths
Blind clergy
Year of birth unknown
English blind people